Christina Sawaya (born 16 August 1980) is a Lebanese beauty queen. As part of her modelling career, Christina entered a series of pageants between 1998 and 2002 in which she became the winner of Miss University Lebanon in 1998, and was chosen as "Top Lebanon Modeling 1999".

In 2001, Sawaya competed against 19 women to become Miss Lebanon 2001, where she won and became eligible to compete in the Miss Universe, Miss World and Miss International pageants. She then represented her country in the Miss World 2001 pageant, wherein she was unplaced. But at the Miss Universe 2002 Pageant, Sawaya decided to drop out of the competition after stating that she would not compete in a pageant together with Miss Israel, Yamit Har-Noy. She then went on to win the Miss International 2002 contest in Tokyo, Japan on September 30, 2002. Sawaya was chosen as Miss International among 51 other beauties from 51 countries.

She also became the first Miss International winner from Middle Eastern descent. In the same year, Miss World 2002 was Azra Akın from Turkey and the original winner of Miss Earth 2002 was Džejla Glavović from Bosnia and Herzegovina, which are all hailed from dominant Muslim countries. Christina Sawaya is a conservative Catholic Christian that comes from Lebanon, the only Arab country where the president is Christian by the constitution.

On 15 November 2003, Sawaya married Tony Baroud in Beirut and had two kids. Baroud is a former member of the Lebanese national basketball team and now a sports commentator and TV entertainer with the Lebanese Broadcasting Corporation. Tony also hosted the 2007 Miss Lebanon pageant. The couple divorced in 2015.

References

External links
Christina Sawaya Official Fan Page

1980 births
Lebanese beauty pageant winners
Living people
Miss International 2002 delegates
Miss International winners
Miss World 2001 delegates
Lebanese film actresses
Lebanese American University alumni
Greek Orthodox Christians from Lebanon